Promethium(III) nitrate is an inorganic compound, a salt of promethium and nitric acid with the chemical formula Pm(NO3)3. The compound is radioactive, soluble in water and forms crystalline hydrates.

Synthesis
Reaction of prometium and nitric acid:
Pm + 6HNO3 ->  Pm(NO3)3 + 3NO2 + 3H2O

Physical properties
Promethium(III) nitrate hydrate forms purple-pink solid.

Forms crystalline hydrates of the composition Pm(NO3)3*6H2O.

Chemical properties
Promethium(III) nitrate thermally decomposes to form prometium oxide.

References

Promethium compounds
Nitrates